Gianfranco Cimmino (12 March 1908 – 30 May 1989) was an Italian mathematician, working mathematical analysis, numerical analysis, and theory of elliptic partial differential equations: he is known for being the first mathematician generalizing in a weak sense the notion of boundary value in a boundary value problem, and for doing an influential work in numerical analysis.

Selected works

Scientific works

Scientific papers
.
.
.

Books
. Gianfranco Cimmino's "Selected works", edited under the auspices of the Accademia Pontaniana and of the Academy of Physical and Mathematical Sciences of the Società Nazionale di Scienze Lettere e Arti in Napoli.

Commemorative, historical, and survey works

.
. The "participating address" presented to the International congress on the occasion of the celebration of the centenary of birth of Mauro Picone and Leonida Tonelli (held in Rome on May 6–9, 1985) by Gianfranco Cimmino on behalf of the Accademia delle Scienze dell'Istituto di Bologna.

See also
Luigi Amerio
Distribution (mathematics)
Hyperfunction

Notes

References

Biographical references
. The "Yearbook" of the renowned Italian scientific institution, including an historical sketch of its history, the list of all past and present members as well as a wealth of information about its academic and scientific activities.
. The "Yearbook 2015" of the Accademia Pontaniana, published by the Academy itself and describing its past and present hierarchies and its activities. It also gives some notes on its history, the full list of its and other useful information.
. The first part ("Tomo") of an extensive work on the "Accademia di Scienze, Lettere e Arti di Modena", reporting the history of the academy and biographies of members up to the year 2006.
.
. The biographical and bibliographical entry (updated up to 1976) on Gianfranco Cimmino, published under the auspices of the Accademia dei Lincei in a book collecting many profiles of its members living members up to 1976.
. This is a monographic fascicle published on the "Bollettino dell'Unione Matematica Italiana", describing the history of the Istituto Nazionale di Alta Matematica Francesco Severi from its foundation in 1939 to 2003: an English translation of the title reads as:-"Materials toward a history of the Istituto Nazionale di Alta Matematica from 1939 to 2003". It was written by Gino Roghi and includes a presentation by Salvatore Coen and a preface by Corrado De Concini. It is almost exclusively based on sources from the institute archives: the wealth and variety of materials included, jointly with its appendices and indexes, make this monograph a useful reference not only for the history of the institute itself, but also for the history of many mathematicians who taught or followed the institute courses or simply worked there.
 of the book . The short "Introduction" to Cimmino's selected works by its editors: it includes also a few biographical data.
. The "Yearbook 2014" of the Società Nazionale di Scienze Lettere e Arti in Napoli, published by the society itself and describing its past and present hierarchies, and its activities. It also reports some notes on its history, the full list of its members and other useful information.

General references
.
.
.

Scientific references
. See here for a preprint version of the original paper downloadable from the author's academic home page.
.
. 
.
.

External links

1908 births
1989 deaths
20th-century Italian mathematicians
University of Naples Federico II alumni
Academic staff of the University of Naples Federico II
Members of the Lincean Academy
Mathematical analysts
Numerical analysts
PDE theorists